Sweden competed at the 2002 Winter Olympics in Salt Lake City, United States. Sweden won seven medals; two silver and five bronze. For the first time ever Sweden failed to win gold medals in two straight Winter Olympic Games. On the other hand, they did manage to win medals in five different Winter Olympic sports for the first time, beating the previous record of four sports.

Medalists

Alpine skiing

Men

Women

Women's combined

Biathlon

Men

Men's 4 × 7.5 km relay

Women

 1 A penalty loop of 150 metres had to be skied per missed target. 
 2 Starting delay based on 10 km sprint results. 
 3 One minute added per missed target. 
 4 Starting delay based on 7.5 km sprint results.

Bobsleigh

Women

Cross-country skiing

Men
Sprint

Pursuit

 1 Starting delay based on 10 km C. results. 
 C = Classical style, F = Freestyle

4 × 10 km relay

Women
Sprint

Pursuit

 2 Starting delay based on 5 km C. results. 
 C = Classical style, F = Freestyle

4 × 5 km relay

Curling

Summary

Men's tournament

Group stage
Top four teams advanced to semi-finals.

|}

Medal round
Semi-final

Bronze medal game

Contestants

Women's tournament

Group stage
Top four teams advanced to semi-finals.

|}

Tie-breaker

|}

Contestants

Freestyle skiing

Men

Women

Ice hockey

Summary

Men's tournament

First round - group C

Quarter final

Team roster
Johan Hedberg
Mikael Tellqvist
Tommy Salo
Mattias Öhlund
Kim Johnsson
Fredrik Olausson
Nicklas Lidström
Marcus Ragnarsson
Mattias Norström
Kenny Jönsson
Daniel Alfredsson
P. J. Axelsson
Mats Sundin
Mathias Johansson
Mikael Renberg
Magnus Arvedson
Ulf Dahlén
Niklas Sundström
Henrik Zetterberg
Jörgen Jönsson
Markus Näslund
Michael Nylander
Tomas Holmström
Head coach: Hardy Nilsson

Women's tournament

First round - group A
Top two teams (shaded) advanced to semifinals.

Medal round
Semi-final

Bronze medal game

Luge

Men

(Men's) Doubles

Short track speed skating

Men

Snowboarding

Men's parallel giant slalom

Men's halfpipe

Women's parallel giant slalom

Women's halfpipe

Speed skating

Men

References
 Olympic Winter Games 2002, full results by sports-reference.com

Nations at the 2002 Winter Olympics
2002
Winter Olympics